Black Bottom is an unincorporated community in Cullman County, Alabama, United States, located near the junction of Interstate 65 and Alabama State Route 91,  east of Colony.

References

Unincorporated communities in Cullman County, Alabama
Unincorporated communities in Alabama